This is a list of notable people who were born or have lived in Krasnodar (1793–1920: Yekaterinodar), Russia.

Born in Krasnodar

19th century

1801–1850 
 Dmitry Averkiyev (1836–1905), Russian playwright, theatre critic, novelist, publicist and translator

1851–1900 
 Alexander Tamanian (1878–1936), Russian-born Armenian neoclassical architect
 Andrei Shkuro (1887–1947), Lieutenant General of the White Army
 Semyon Kirlian (1898–1978), Russian inventor and researcher of Armenian descent
 Pyotr Gavrilov (1900–1979), Soviet war hero, last defender of the Brest Fortress

20th century

1901–1930 
 Stanisław Szpinalski (1901–1957), Polish pianist
 Valeriy Tereshchenko (1901–1994), Russian scientist in the field of management
 Pavel Parenago (1906–1960), Soviet scientist, astronomer, and professor
 Elena Skuin (1908–1986), Soviet and Russian painter, watercolorist, graphic artist, and art teacher
 Marina Denikina (1919–2005), Russian-born French writer and journalist
 Yevgeniya Zhigulenko (1920–1994), Russian pilot and navigator in the 46th Taman Guards Night Bomber Aviation Regiment (Night Witches) of the Soviet Air Forces during World War II who was awarded the title Hero of the Soviet Union
 Alexander Grunauer (1921–2013), Soviet scientist and expert in the field of problems of regulation of internal combustion engines
 Nikolay Dorizo (1923–2011), Russian poet
 Valentin Varennikov (1923–2009), Soviet Army general and Russian politician
 Grigory Mkrtychan (1925–2003), Soviet and Russian ice hockey goalkeeper
 Sergei Salnikov (1925–1984), Russian football player and manager
 Pavel Rakityansky (1928-1992), was a Russian modern pentathlete. He competed at the 1952 Summer Olympics.
 Eduard Grigoryan (1929–1988), Soviet professional soccer player, coach and manager of FC Ararat

1931–1960 
 Vitold Kreyer (1932–2020), Russian triple jumper
 Viktor Likhonosov (1936–2021), writer
 Vera Galushka-Duyunova (1945–2012), Russian volleyball player
 Viktor Popkov (1946–2001), Russian Christian, dissident, humanitarian, human rights activist and journalist
 Alexander Varchenko (born 1949), Soviet and Russian mathematician
 Sergei Vorzhev (born 1950), artist
 Karen Shakhnazarov (born 1952), Soviet and Russian-Armenian filmmaker, producer and screenwriter
 Mikhail Strikhanov (born 1952), Russian physicist
 Lyubov Rusanova (born 1954), Russian swimmer
 Sergey Arakelov (born 1957), Russian heavyweight weightlifter
 Yekaterina Fesenko (born 1958), Russian athlete
 Yevgeny Lipeyev (born 1958), Soviet modern pentathlete and Olympic Champion
 Gennady Padalka (born 1958), Russian Air Force officer and cosmonaut

1961–1970 
 Vissarion (born 1961), Russian mystic and spiritual leader
 Vladimir Grig (born 1962), Russian artist and musician
 Mikhail Guzev (born 1962), Russian mathematician, mechanician and a corresponding member of the Russian Academy of Sciences
 Andrey Lavrov (born 1962), Russian and Soviet handball goalkeeper
 Pavel Sukosyan (born 1962), Russian handball player
 Igor Pestretsov (born 1963), Russian former professional footballer
 Nikolai Yuzhanin (born 1963), Russian professional football coach and a former player
 Sergei Kovalyov (born 1965), Russian professional football player
 Valentina Ogiyenko (born 1965), Russian volleyball player
 Irina Mushayilova (born 1967), Russian athlete
 Vadim Rudenko (born 1967), Russian pianist
 Tatyana Shikolenko (born 1968), Russian track and field athlete who competed in the javelin throw
 Violetta Egorova (born 1969), concert pianist
 Dmitry Filippov (born 1969), Russian handball player
 Radzislaw Arlowski (born 1970), Belarusian professional footballer
 Albert Avdolyan (born 1970), Russian businessman

1971–1980 
 Alexander Karasyov (born 1971), writer
 Anna Netrebko (born 1971), Russian and Austrian opera singer
 Pavel Tregubov (born 1971), Russian chess Grandmaster
 Alexandre Bondar (born 1972), Russian writer and novelist
 Yevgeni Plotnikov (born 1972), Russian professional football coach and player
 Evgeny Pechonkin (born 1973), Russian bobsledder
 Sergei Tiviakov (born 1973), chess Grandmaster
 Oleg Khodkov (born 1974), Russian handball player
 Vitali Ushakov (born 1974), Russian football player
 Igor Dubrovskikh (born 1975), Russian professional football player
 Irina Fedotova (born 1975), Russian rower
 Irina Karavayeva (born 1975), trampoline gymnast
 Dmitri Khokhlov (born 1975), Russian football player and coach
 Eduard Koksharov (born 1975), Russian handball player
 Vladimir Pantyushenko (born 1975), Russian professional football player
 Natalia Chernova (born 1976), gymnast
 Andrei Chuprina (born 1976), Russian football player
 Maksim Demenko (born 1976), Russian professional footballer
 Mikhail Voronov (born 1976), Russian professional footballer
 Maksim Buznikin (born 1977), Russian professional footballer
 Andrei Chichkin (born 1977), Russian association football goalkeeper
 Yehor Soboliev (born 1977), Ukrainian politician and former journalist
 Dmitriy Vorobyov (born 1977), Russian professional footballer
 Aleksandr Krestinin (born 1978), Russian professional football player and manager
 Aleksandr Chernoivanov (born 1979), Russian handball player
 Igor Kiselyov (1979–2014), Russian professional footballer
 Aleksey Savrasenko (born 1979), Russian-Greek professional basketball player
 Vitali Kaleshin (born 1980), Russian professional footballer
 Igor Kot (born 1980), Russian professional footballer
 Lazaros Papadopoulos (born 1980), Greek basketball player
 Margarita Simonyan (born 1980), Russian journalist
 Andrei Topchu (born 1980), Russian football player

1981–1990 
 Dmitry Trapeznikov (born 1981), former acting Head of the Donetsk People's Republic from 31 August 2018 until 7 September 2018
 Aleksei Uvarov (born 1981), Russian professional footballer
 Yekaterina Kibalo (born 1982), Russian swimmer
 Sergei Bendz (born 1983), Russian professional footballer
 Nikita Khokhlov (born 1983), Kazakh football midfielder
 Oleg Grams (born 1984), Russian handball player
 Oleg Skopintsev (born 1984), Russian handball player
 Irina Bliznova (born 1986), Russian handball player
 Vladimir Ostroushko (born 1986), Russian rugby union player
 Valery Valynin (born 1986), Russian cyclist
 Inna Zhukova (born 1986), rhythmic gymnast
 Vladlena Bobrovnikova (born 1987), Russian handball player
 Ilya Ezhov (born 1987), ice hockey goaltender, Gagarin Cup champion
 Olga Panova (born 1987), Russian tennis player
 Tatyana Chernova (born 1988), Russian heptathlon athlete
 Yevgeny Ovsiyenko (born 1988), Russian professional footballer
 Andrei Vasyanovich (born 1988), Russian professional footballer
 Vitali Dyakov (born 1989), Russian professional footballer
 Vasiliy Kondratenko (born 1989), Russian bobsledder
 Artur Maloyan (born 1989), Russian professional footballer of Armenian ethnic origin
 Alexandra Panova (born 1989), Russian tennis player
 Olesia Romasenko (born 1990), Russian sprint canoeist
 Anna Sen (born 1990), Russian handball player

1991–2000 
 Viacheslav Krasilnikov (born 1991), Russian beach volleyball player
 Vyacheslav Mikhaylevsky (born 1991), Russian rower
 Yuri Nesterenko (born 1991), Russian professional football player
 Arsen Beglaryan (born 1993), Armenian football player
 Ilya Polikutin (born 1994), Russian football player
 Danil Prutsev (born 2000), Russian football player

21st century 
 Ivan Repyakh (born 2001), Russian football player

Lived in Krasnodar 
 Fyodor Shcherbachenko (born 1962), Russian professional football coach and a former player
 Alexander Moskalenko (born 1969), Russian gymnast and Olympic champion
 Boris Savchenko (born 1986), Russian chess grandmaster

See also 

 List of Russian people
 List of Russian-language poets

References 

Krasnodar